

People
 27 January – Death of John James Audubon, French-American ornithologist, naturalist and painter who produced the monumental Birds of America
 5 July – Birth of William Brewster, American ornithologist and cofounder of the American Ornithologists' Union

Books
Emmanuel Le Maout Les Mammifères et les Oiseaux (1851–1854, 2 vol. gr. in-8, illustrés. Showy work for the publishers stand at Exposition Universelle in 1855 
Jacques Pucheran, 1851 Catalogue méthodique de la collection des mammifères de la collection des oiseaux et des collections annexes Paris Gide et Baud online Gallica
Edward Vernon Harcourt A Sketch of Madeira London, John Murray,1851.  online BHL

Birds
Birds described in 1851 include the bare-necked umbrellabird, common ʻamakihi, dusky-headed parakeet, Madeira firecrest, Madeiran storm petrel, North Island brown kiwi, olive sparrow, grey-crowned palm-tanager, red-headed fody, rufous-throated tanager, silver-throated tanager, Sri Lanka bush warbler, yellow-bellied tanager and yellow-eared bulbul.

The last Norfolk kaka died in captivity in London.

Isidore Geoffroy Saint-Hilaire describes the Elephant bird.

Institutions
K.k. Naturhistorisches Hofmuseum in Vienna extensively reorganized.

Ongoing events
John Gould The birds of Australia; Supplement 1851–69. 1 vol. 81 plates; Artists: J. Gould and H. C. Richter; Lithographer: H. C. Richter
John Gould The birds of Asia; 1850-83 7 vols. 530 plates, Artists: J. Gould, H. C. Richter, W. Hart and J. Wolf; Lithographers:H. C. Richter and W. Hart 

Birding and ornithology by year
Birding
Birding